Polytetrahedron is a term used for three distinct types of objects, all based
on the tetrahedron:

A uniform convex 4-polytope made up of 600 tetrahedral cells. It is more commonly known as a 600-cell or hexacosichoron. Other derivative 4-polytope are identified as polytetrahedra, where a qualifying prefix such as rectified or truncated is used.
A connected set of regular tetrahedra, the 3-dimensional analogue of a polyiamond. Polytetrahedra and polyiamonds are related as polycubes are related to polyominoes.
In origami, a polypolyhedron is "a compound of multiple linked polyhedral skeletons with uniform nonintersecting edges" . There exist two topologically distinct polytetrahedra, each made up of four intersecting triangles.

See also 
 Compound of five tetrahedra
 Compound of ten tetrahedra

References

4-polytopes
Polyhedra
Paper folding